Rafael Pires Vieira (born 1 August 1978), better known simply as Rafael, is a Brazilian former football centre forward.

References

External links

Player profile on fclahti.fi

1978 births
Living people
Brazilian footballers
Brazilian expatriate footballers
Association football forwards
Veikkausliiga players
FC Lahti players
Helsingin Jalkapalloklubi players
SC Heerenveen players
Denizlispor footballers
Brazilian expatriate sportspeople in Finland
FC Jazz players
Expatriate footballers in Finland